The 7mm BR Remington, commonly called the 7mm BR or the 7mm Benchrest Remington in long form, was a cartridge developed by Remington for the Remington XP-100 single-shot bolt-action handgun. The cartridge was developed for the Unlimited Class in the sport of Metallic silhouette shooting. Later it was introduced in the Remington Model XB-40 single-shot bolt-action rifle, which was specifically designed for the benchrest shooting community.

The 7mm BR is based on previous Remington benchrest cartridges 6mm BR Remington and the .22 BR Remington cartridges. These cartridges in turn trace their origin to .308 Winchester via the .308×1.5-inch Barnes cartridge. The 7mm BR was designed by merely necking up the pre-existing 6mm BR Remington to accept a .28 caliber (7 mm) bullet.

As a hunting cartridge it is adequate for smaller deer species and ranges under . With lighter bullets, this cartridge makes an excellent varmint or predator cartridge. The 7mm BR Remington, however, was conceived as a competitive handgun cartridge for Metallic Shooting. Later it was also adopted in Benchrest shooting by Remington who introduced the X-40 rifle in that chambering.

At one time Remington produced ammunition and cases for this cartridge. They continued to supply the 7mm BR Remington case though to the early 1990s. Today the cartridge is considered obsolete and no one produces loaded ammunition and Remington no longer manufactures firearms chambered for this cartridge.  In April 2020 Peterson's began producing properly headstamped brass.

See also

 Table of handgun and rifle cartridges

Footnotes

Pistol and rifle cartridges
Remington Arms cartridges